Dockyard railway station is a Great Western Railway suburban station on the Cornish Main Line in Devonport, Plymouth, England. As the name implies, it serves Devonport Dockyard.

History

This station was opened by the Great Western Railway on 1 June 1905, one of many halts built to combat the competition from electric trams.

The Great Western Railway was nationalised into British Railways from 1 January 1948 which was in turn privatised in the 1990s.

Facilities
The station has basic amenities only: a shelter on platform 1, plus bike racks and timetable poster boards on both sides.  No staffing or ticket facilities are available, so intending passengers must buy on board the train or prior to travel.  Step-free access is available to each platform.

Services
Only Tamar Valley line trains call here on Sundays.

This station is a request stop which means that passengers alighting here must tell the conductor that they wish to do so, and those waiting to join must signal clearly to the driver as the train approaches.

Community railway
The railway from Plymouth to Gunnislake is designated as a community railway and is supported by marketing provided by the Devon and Cornwall Rail Partnership.  The line is promoted under the "Tamar Valley Line" name.  It was part of the Dartmoor Sunday Rover network of integrated bus and rail routes.

References

Railway stations in Plymouth, Devon
Former Great Western Railway stations
Railway stations in Great Britain opened in 1905
Railway stations served by Great Western Railway
Railway request stops in Great Britain
DfT Category F2 stations